As of April 2013, there are 11 conservation areas in the borough of Crawley in West Sussex, England. Crawley has ancient origins as a market town, but following centuries of gradual growth it was transformed in the postwar era when it was selected as a New Town. The population is now over 100,000. Several areas retain their long-established character and buildings of historic interest, and some postwar parts of the town have been designated as conservation areas because of their architectural and social importance.

The definition of a conservation area is a principally urban area "of special architectural or historic interest, the character or appearance of which it is desirable to preserve or enhance". Such areas are identified according to criteria defined by Sections 69 and 70 of the Planning (Listed Buildings and Conservation Areas) Act 1990. Crawley Borough Council is responsible for creating conservation areas within its boundaries. As well as following the statutory definition, it states that conservation area status is granted on the basis of "a number of factors and does not solely relate to the age of the buildings; for instance architectural interest and setting of an area are also important factors." Specific features of interest include historic street patterns, materials used in buildings, paths and boundaries, the character of the public realm, the relationship between buildings and surrounding open space, and "a strong sense of place". Conservation area status regulates but does not preclude new construction, demolition or redevelopment work.

Overview

Present-day Crawley, whose population was 106,597 at the time of the 2011 United Kingdom census, was formed by the merging of the small market town of Crawley (which lay astride the main London–Brighton road), the village of Ifield to the west, the railway settlement of Three Bridges to the east, and the ancient village of Worth to the southeast, whose Saxon church was at the heart of a vast parish. This gradual and haphazard development was greatly accelerated from 1947 when a detailed masterplan was drawn up by the Commission for New Towns, which aimed to rehouse large numbers of people from war-damaged London slums in a series of self-contained new towns around the city. Crawley was the second such town to be designated, and over the next few decades 13 residential neighbourhoods, a large industrial estate, a new town centre and many other facilities were built around the existing development. Local governance—split across several county, district and parish councils—was consolidated into a new entity which took its present form, Crawley Borough Council, in 1974.

The council created its first conservation area in 1981 when it designated Ifield Village. Although Ifield became one of the 13 New Town neighbourhoods, the ancient village centre's character as a "small, scattered rural settlement" remained. It was recorded in the Domesday Book and had several ancient manors, inns and houses; and St Margaret's Church, the Anglican parish church, had 13th-century origins and replaced an even older wooden place of worship.

The Worth and High Street conservation areas also reflect the importance of the ancient features, buildings, townscapes and open space which survive from the medieval era and earlier in those parts of the borough. Worth's church, St Nicholas', is a "remarkable example of a pre-Conquest building" with a 10th- or 11th-century cruciform layout and apsidal east end. On the approach to it are 17th-century buildings of traditional local materials such as Street House (a former inn) and a timber-and-stone lychgate. Several other old houses, a moat and ancient trees contribute to the setting of the village, which until the late 20th century was still rural and isolated but which has now been surrounded by urban development (including, at close quarters, the M23 motorway). Crawley High Street, the natural halfway point between London and the fashionable seaside resort of Brighton, has been important since King John granted a charter for a weekly market there in 1202. No buildings of that antiquity survive, but St John the Baptist's Church (part of the High Street conservation area, although set back along a narrow path) has 14th-century fabric. Surviving medieval and later buildings, some of which are timber-framed hall houses, include the Ancient Priors, the Old Punch Bowl, Tree House, the Brewery Shades, the George Hotel ("Crawley's most celebrated building") and the White Hart Inn. Especially after it was turnpiked in 1770, the street became a popular stopping point for refreshment, entertainment, the changing of horses and other activities; inns, cafés and (later) cycling shops and garages proliferated among the mix of houses and shops which had developed over several centuries.

The Brighton Road and St Peter's conservation areas reflect the Victorian development of Crawley into a comfortable suburban town and its further expansion in the Edwardian era.  "Charming" well-built houses in various styles, mostly by the two local building firms of James Longley and Richard Cook, spread down the Brighton Road and along nearby streets between 1870 and the early 20th century, after Crawley railway station was built. Distinctive buildings such as the Railway Hotel—now a pub—Nightingale House, built as a bank in 1901, the Grade II-listed railway signalbox and the former Imperial Cinema (with its "typical 1920s cinema architecture" of Classical-style arched windows, stone balustrade and open pediment) added to the area's character. Meanwhile, West Green was developing into a modest residential community around the core of an ancient settlement of "a few villagey cottages" on the Crawley–Ifield road. Typical Victorian housing was built in the second half of the 19th century, and St Peter's Church (1892–93, by W. Hilton Nash) was provided to serve the area. These older houses were retained when West Green was built up as Crawley New Town's first neighbourhood from the late 1940s, and together with the church they form the basis for the present conservation area.

The other three conservation areas cover small areas of residential buildings of the 1930s (Dyers Almshouses), 1950s (Sunnymead Flats) and 1970s (Forestfield and Shrublands). The Dyers Almshouses moved to Crawley from London in 1939, and more were added over the next four decades. There are now 30 of the distinctive Arts and Crafts-style brick and tile buildings, all set round a formal quadrangle on a road behind the town centre. The six blocks of flats in the Sunnymead development were some of the first residential buildings of the New Town era: they were provided for construction workers.  Crawley Borough Council still maintains them. In the Furnace Green neighbourhood (one of the later New Town developments, started in the late 1960s), Forestfield and Shrublands were designed by architecture firm Phippen Randall Parkes as two self-contained residential communities consisting of houses which were sold on a leasehold basis to residents by the housing association for which they were built. With their south-southeastward orientation and large areas of glazing, the architecturally distinctive pale concrete houses of Shrublands receive plenty of natural light, and each house and garden has a close relationship with the central area of green space. Forestfield's houses are grouped around areas of open space with pathways, and are of contrasting dark and pale brick. Car parking is extensive but well disguised. The layout was also designed with proximity to the ancient Tilgate Forest in mind: the houses have views into it, and paths lead directly in.

In 2010, Crawley Borough Council commissioned a study to investigate locally listed buildings and other heritage assets. This study examined several areas which had been suggested as possible conservation areas. Six were put forward for further investigation. In November 2010, one (Gossops Green Neighbourhood Centre) was withdrawn, but the other five (Hazelwick Road, Langley Lane, Malthouse Road, Southgate Neighbourhood Centre and West Street) were accepted. Three were to be entirely new conservation areas, and the other two would be extensions to existing areas. Public consultation took place in 2012 and revealed strong support for the council's proposals. After some amendments and further consultation, the final report was produced in March 2013. The proposals were accepted on 3 April 2013, and the council began the legal process of designating the new conservation areas. Hazelwick Road and Malthouse Road date from the Victorian and Edwardian periods and are principally residential, while the Southgate Neighbourhood Centre was one of the mixed-use areas created as part of the New Town masterplan. Langley Lane in Ifield, which has ancient origins, has been included within the Ifield Village conservation area, and the Victorian houses of West Street have now been added to the Brighton Road area.

Conservation areas

Map

See also
List of conservation areas in Brighton and Hove
Listed buildings in Crawley
Locally listed buildings in Crawley

References

Notes

Bibliography

Crawley
Crawley Conservation areas
Crawley
Crawley